Faith in the Future is a British comedy television show running from 17 November 1995 to 27 February 1998. A sequel to the show Second Thoughts, it aired on ITV for 22 episodes.

The show continues the story of Faith Greyshott (Lynda Bellingham), newly single after splitting from her long-term partner, Bill, at the end of Second Thoughts. With her daughter Hannah (Julia Sawalha) away travelling and her son Joe now in a shared flat, Faith decides it's time to stop being a wife and mother and live her life for herself; however, her plans are scuppered when Hannah returns and moves back home.

The series has been repeated on ITV3.

Characters

Faith (Lynda Bellingham) - A 40-something, divorced mother of two looking to rebuild her life following the break-up of her long-term relationship. Formerly a commercial artist, she begins working as an art teacher at a local college where she meets upholsterer Paul, who becomes her on-off boyfriend. Although keen to put herself first and enjoy life as a single woman, issues such as Hannah's return and the menopause get in the way.
Hannah (Julia Sawalha) - Faith's headstrong daughter, who returns home after a year travelling expecting to live with her mother again, only to find she has sold the family home and now lives alone. Having dropped out of university in Second Thoughts, she takes on a variety of unsuccessful jobs, including dressing as a giant mouse to promote cheese, before deciding to train as a counsellor. Like her mother, she has a difficult love life, having several failed relationships.
Paul (Jeff Rawle) - Faith's on-off boyfriend; an upholsterer who also teaches at the college. Although attracted to Faith, he is constantly frustrated by her regular changes of heart and erratic behaviour.
Jools (Charlie Creed-Miles - (Series 1); Simon Pegg - Series 2–3) - A kind-hearted, but somewhat naive, young man who becomes obsessed with Hannah after she is dumped by his friend Nick. He is notoriously clumsy and accident-prone (to the point that he thinks it is his fault when a tree crashes through Faith's window). Although other women, including Hannah's friend Caroline and Faith's friend June, show an interest in him, Jools only has eyes for Hannah, despite her continuing disparagement of him.

Minor characters
Joe (Mark Denham) - Faith's son. A regular character in Second Thoughts, he appears in just one episode of Faith in the Future, when he tells his mother he has important news for her. Faith suspects Joe is about to come out as gay; however, his news is actually that he has joined the Conservative Party - something that Faith, an ardent Labour supporter, is horrified by.
Caroline (Emma Bernard) - Hannah's long-time best friend who develops a crush on Jools, despite being married with a child. She later splits from her husband Dave, but is apparently oblivious to the signs that he is actually gay.
Zoë (Susannah Wise) - Faith's eldest daughter whom she gave up for adoption prior to her marriage, and whose existence is revealed in the final series. She is a somewhat innocent, naïve girl who contrasts sharply with the more gregarious Hannah.
Harry (Christopher Villiers) - Hannah's tutor, later her boyfriend. He asks her to move in with him in the penultimate episode; however, when she catches him cheating on her she decides to go travelling with Jools instead.
Mark (Ivan Kaye) - A somewhat boorish builder who Hannah thinks is chatting her up; however, he is actually interested in Faith and begins dating her towards the end of the series.

Episode guide

Series 1: 1995

Series 2: 1996

Series 3: 1998

DVD release
The Complete Series of Faith in the Future was released by Network on 13 April 2015.

References

External links
.
.

1990s British sitcoms
1995 British television series debuts
1998 British television series endings
ITV sitcoms
British television spin-offs
London Weekend Television shows
Television series by ITV Studios
English-language television shows
Television series by Little Brother Productions